Anapoto is an associated commune on the island of Rimatara, in French Polynesia. According to the 2017 census, it had grown to a population 268 people.

References

Geography of the Austral Islands
Populated places in French Polynesia